Madamakki is a 2016 Indian Kannada film directed by Vinay Preetham starring Tanush Shivanna and Nikitha Narayan in the lead roles. The supporting cast features Saikumar, Tara, Deepika Kamaiah. The music is scored by Anoop Seelin and cinematography is by Kiran Hampapur. The film released on 19 August 2016 across Karnataka.

Cast 
 Tanush Shivanna as Sadhu
 Nikitha Narayan
 Saikumar
 Tara
 Deepika Kamaiah
 Rajendra Karanth
 Kari Subbu
 Muniraj
 Sandeep
 Vishal

References 

2016 films
2010s Kannada-language films